Wolfsburg (Eastphalian: Wulfsborg) is the fifth largest city in the German state of Lower Saxony, located on the river Aller.

Wolfsburg is famous as the location of Volkswagen AG's headquarters and the world's biggest car plant. The Autostadt is a visitor attraction next to the Volkswagen factory that features the company's model range: Audi, Bentley, Bugatti, Ducati, Lamborghini, MAN, Neoplan, Porsche, Scania, SEAT, Škoda Auto and Volkswagen Commercial Vehicles. Wolfsburg is one of the few German cities built during the first half of the 20th century as a planned city. From its founding on 1 July 1938 as a home for workers producing the "KdF-"Wagen" until 25 May 1945, the city was called Stadt des KdF-Wagens bei Fallersleben. In 1972, the population first exceeded 100,000. In 2019, the GRP was €188,453 per capita.

Geography
Wolfsburg is located at the Southern edge of the ancient river valley of the Aller at the Mittellandkanal ("Midland Canal"). It is bordered by the districts of Gifhorn and Helmstedt.

Climate
Only 7% of all observation stations of the Deutscher Wetterdienst (German weather service) record lower measurements. The warmest month is July and the driest month is February, most precipitation is measured in June where observation stations measure.

History

The "Wolfsburg" castle was first mentioned in 1302 in a document as the domicile of the noble lineage of Bartensleben. Originally a keep next to the Aller, it was protected by a moat some centuries later. In 1372, the first documentary reference to the Burg Neuhaus ("castle of Neuhaus") near Wolfsburg appeared. After the extinction of the Bartensleben line in 1742, the property and its Schloss Wolfsburg (Wolfsburg castle) passed on to the Counts of Schulenburg. The communal manor was an important employer for the nearby settlements Rothenfelde and Heßlingen.

Some of today's urban districts, including Vorsfelde and the villages transferred to Wolfsburg from the county of Helmstedt, belonged to the Principality of Brunswick-Wolfenbüttel. Fallersleben and other villages belonged to the Electorate of Braunschweig-Lüneburg, which later developed into the Kingdom of Hanover and became a Prussian province in 1866. Other urban districts, including Heßlingen, belonged to the Prussian Duchy of Magdeburg. In 1932, these districts were detached from the Prussian Province of Saxony and integrated into the Province of Hanover.

Wolfsburg was founded on 1 July 1938 as the Stadt des KdF-Wagens bei Fallersleben, in English  "City of the Strength Through Joy car at Fallersleben", a planned town centred around the village of Fallersleben, built to house workers of the Volkswagen factories erected to assemble what would be later known as the Volkswagen Beetle. During World War II, military cars, aeroplanes, and other military equipment were built there, mainly by forced workers and prisoners-of-war. In 1942, German authorities established the Arbeitsdorf concentration camp in the city for a few months. A minimum of six individuals died while working at this camp.

The city and Volkswagen factory were captured on April 11, 1945 by US troops and about 7,700 forced labourers were liberated from the Volkswagen factory. The US troops occupied the city until the end of June, during which time the city was renamed Wolfsburg on 25 May 1945, after the eponymous castle located there. The American occupation ended at the end of June 1945 when the region became part of the British occupation zone. In 1951, Wolfsburg was separated from the District of Gifhorn, and became an urban district.

In 1955, the one-millionth VW Beetle was manufactured in Wolfsburg. Postwar Beetle production ended in Wolfsburg in 1974, though Beetle production continued within Germany at Emden until 1978. The factories in Wolfsburg remain a key part of Volkswagen's production capacity.

During the German economic miracle Wolfsburg experienced a large influx of immigrant workers, especially from Italy.

In 1958, the city hall was built. In 1960 the Volkswagenwerk GmbH (limited partnership with a limited liability) was changed into an AG (public limited company).

In the course of a land reform in Lower Saxony in 1972, 20 localities were added to the city through the "Wolfsburg-Act". Wolfsburg gained the status of major city with nearly 131,000 inhabitants. In 1973, the city's population peaked at 131,971.

In 1982, the A39, a side road of the A2 (Oberhausen - Hannover - Werder), was built as a direct freeway to Wolfsburg.

In 1988, the city became a university town with the establishment of the University of Applied Science Braunschweig/Wolfenbüttel. Today its name is Ostfalia University of Applied Sciences.

As a launch promotion for the 5th generation of the Volkswagen Golf the city of Wolfsburg welcomed visitors on the internet, on the official stationery, and on every city limit sign with the name "Golfsburg" from 25 August to 10 October 2003. This campaign gained the nationwide attention of press, radio, and TV broadcasting.

In the summer of 2009, Wolfsburg gained nationwide attention when their football team, VfL Wolfsburg, won the German football league. A party was held in the city centre with about 100,000 people, the first in the history of the city.

Culture and attractions

The centre of Wolfsburg is unique in Germany. Instead of a medieval city centre, Wolfsburg features a new and modern attraction called the Autostadt. The old part of the city Alt Wolfsburg (de) shows some manor buildings in traditional framework style. Atop a hill by the River Aller is the Wolfsburg Castle.

The Autostadt is an open-air museum-theme park dedicated to automobiles owned and operated by Volkswagen. In the center of the park are the pavilions featuring Volkswagen's major brands: Volkswagen and Audi to the north, further south are SEAT, Škoda Auto, Lamborghini, Bentley, Bugatti and the Premium Clubhouse. Right next to the lagoon is the Porsche pavilion. The striking Volkswagen Commercial Vehicles pavilion is in the south-east of the park.
The Autostadt also includes: a planetarium; a Ritz-Carlton hotel; the Phaeno Science Center, the largest hands-on science museum in Germany; a water skiing resort; and a private art museum (Kunstmuseum Wolfsburg) specialised in modern and contemporary art.

Another major attraction is the Wolfsburg Water Show, the world's largest water-flame-laser-video fountain show with its up to 70 meter high fountains which was in the Autostadt complex in 2014. The event sometimes can be seen when there are special events in the complex. 

Besides the Autostadt, another best known and most distinctive is BadeLand. It's a beautiful wellness and relaxation centre with a bathing area and various saunas.

Population development
From about 1,000 inhabitants in 1938, the population of the city increased to 25,000 in 1950 and doubled to 50,000 until 1958. On 1 July 1972, the population of Wolfsburg first went beyond the mark of 100,000 because several adjacent suburbanized villages were incorporated into the city with the "Wolfsburg law" which made Wolfsburg a major city ("Großstadt“). In 1973, the population reached its highest level: 131,971. At the end of December 2010, 121,451 people were registered with their principal residence in Wolfsburg. By the end of 2012, this number had climbed to 123,144.

Organization
The city of Wolfsburg is organized into 40 districts. One or more districts make up one of the total of 16 localities which are represented by their own councils. Every council has a local official as its mayor.

First the councils were only established in the 11 localities annexed in 1972. They partly took over the functions of the former city councils of each of the districts. In 1991 and 2001 some of the localities were split into smaller areas so that today there are 16 localities, each with its own council which are directly elected by the citizens.

The only exception from this organization is the Allerpark (Aller Park), a local recreation area surrounding the Allersee lake, and the area of the Volkswagen factory which are both located in the central city area.

The administrative area of Wolfsburg includes six nature reserves. Five of them are located in the ancient Aller river valley.

Politics

Head of the young "Stadt des KdF-Wagens" became the government assessor Karl Bock on enactment #145 of the chief president of the government of Lüneburg effective from 1 July 1938. His followers were also deployed by the government.

In 1946, the military government of the British zone of occupation established a communal constitution following the British example. After this, citizens voted for a council which elected a volunteer mayor/ lord mayor as the city's leader and representative. After 1946, the council elected a full-time director to lead the city council. In 2001, the city council's dual leadership was abolished. It is led by a full-time lord mayor who is also the city's representative. Since 2001, citizens directly elect the lord mayor. The council still has its own chairperson elected by the council's constitutive conference after every local election. The current "Bürgermeister" of Wolfsburg Dennis Weilmann.

The city has been described as a “social democratic utopia”.

City council
The city council is made up of the fractions of the different parties (47 seats) and the lord mayor with one seat. The lord mayor is head of administration, thus the superior of all employees of the city council. The lord mayor is supported by four departmental heads that are voted by the council on his proposal. Together, they make up the board of directors of the city administration where the most important decisions concerning administration are deliberated weekly.

Results of the local elections on 11 September 2011:

Voter participations: 49.4%.

Emblems
Wolfsburg's emblem shows a silver two-tower castle with a closed gate on red ground over a green base with silver waved timbers. A golden wolf with a blue tongue paces over the castle's battlement. The city's flag is green and white.

Lower Saxony's Department of the Interior awarded the city of Wolfsburg's emblem in 1952 after it had been constituted in the association articles in 1947. In 1961, it was improved heraldically and newly awarded by the governmental executive committee of Lüneburg. The symbols of the wolf and the castle reflect the city's name (canting arm) and do not have a historical, directly conveyed reference. The flag was adopted in 1955.

Volkswagen used a modified version of the Wolfsburg coat of arms as its steering wheel emblem, (and occasionally as a hood ornament, on classic Beetles) until the early 1980s, when it was replaced by the VW roundel.

Regional authorities
The city of Wolfsburg is a member of the association Braunschweigische Landschaft e.V. with a registered office in Braunschweig and in the Lüneburgischen Landschaftsverband e.V. with a registered office in Uelzen. These associations were founded to foster cultural establishments of the regions.

Architecture

Historical castles
 The Schloss Wolfsburg (castle of Wolfsburg), a Weser renaissance castle of the 13th century, was first documented as the domicile of the noble lineage of Bartensleben in 1302. As the city is named after this castle, it is Wolfsburg's landmark.
 The Burg Neuhaus (castle of Neuhaus) is a medieval moat from the 14th century which has been owned by the city government since 1981.
 The Schloss Fallersleben (castle of Fallersleben) was completed in 1551. Since 1991 it has housed the Hoffmann-von-Fallersleben-Museum.

Museums
 The Kunstmuseum Wolfsburg (Art museum Wolfsburg) is internationally renowned and has shown contemporary and modern international art since 1994
 The Städtische Galerie (Municipal Gallery), located in the Schloss Wolfsburg shows multifarious pieces of contemporary art
 The AutoMuseum Volkswagen was opened in an old textile factory in Heßlingen in 1985
 The Stadtmuseum Wolfsburg (City Museum) is a modern museum with an exhibition about the history of the castle, the region and the city. It is located inside the castle of Wolfsburg.
 The Hoffmann-von-Fallersleben-Museum in the castle of Fallersleben shows the history of German poetry and democracy, especially focused on the life of Hoffmann von Fallersleben between 1798 and 1874.
 The Heinrich-Büssing-Haus in Nordsteimke was opened on the initiative of the MAN-group in the house of Büssing's birth in 1988. It shows the life of Büssing and the development from craft to industry.
 The Burg Neuhaus (castle of Neuhaus) is a moat showing an exhibition of models of the castle and the water mill, late medieval weapons and documents concerning the life of people of the time before 1800.
 The Autostadt is, after Disneyland Paris, the most visited theme park in Europe.  The theme is (auto) mobility.
 The Phæno is a science center with 250 experiment stations on an exhibition space of nearly 6,000 square meters. The unique architecture was designed by Zaha Hadid.
 The Romantikpark Landleben (theme park Romantik Park Landleben) in Kästorf shows a historical Lower Saxon village combined with parks and restaurants.

Alvar Aalto designs
Heilig Geist Kirche or Church of the Holy Spirit
Stephanuskirche or the Church of St. Stephen, also known as Detmerode Church
Alvar-Aalto-Kulturhaus or Alvar Aalto Cultural Centre

Sport

The most famous professional sports club in the city is VfL Wolfsburg, established in 1945. The men's football team won the Bundesliga in 2009, the DFB-Pokal in 2015 and the DFL-Supercup in 2015. The women's football team has been even more successful, winning six Bundesliga titles and seven DFB-Pokal titles. The women's team has also succeeded in winning the UEFA Women's Champions League in two consecutive years, 2013 and 2014.

Wolfsburg is also the home of the ice hockey team Grizzlys Wolfsburg, which since 2007 has made it to a leading position in the first-tier Deutsche Eishockey Liga, where it was runner-up in 2011, 2016 and 2017.

Also based in city is the tennis tournament Volkswagen Challenger, which has been held annually in Wolfsburg since 1993.

Twin towns – sister cities

Wolfsburg is twinned with:

 Marignane, France (1963)
 Province of Pesaro and Urbino, Italy (1975)
 Halberstadt, Germany (1989)
 Tolyatti, Russia (1991)
 Bielsko-Biała, Poland (1998)
 Jiading (Shanghai), China (2007)
 Jendouba, Tunisia (2010)

Friendly cities
Wolfsburg also has friendly relations with:

 Popoli, Italy
 Sarajevo, Bosnia and Herzegovina (1985)
 Changchun, China (2006)
 Puebla, Mexico (2010)
 Toyohashi, Japan (2011)
 Chattanooga, United States (2011)
 Dalian, China (2011)
 Nanhai (Foshan), China (2015)

Notable people

August Heinrich Hoffmann von Fallersleben (1798–1874), poet, writer of the German national anthem
Hanns Kerrl (1887–1941), politician (NSDAP)
Liane Winter (1942–2021), marathoner
Rolf-Dieter Postlep (born 1946), economist, President of the University of Kassel in 2000–2015
Gabriele von Lutzau (born 1954), artist and sculptor, stewardess during the kidnapping of the airplane Landshut 1977
Wolfgang Müller (born 1957), artist
Siegfried Reich (born 1959), footballer
Peter Bialobrzeski (born 1961), photographer
Karin Janke (born 1963), sprinter
Sascha Grabow (born 1968), traveler, writer and photographer who visited every country in the world
Edward Berger (born 1970), film director and screenwriter
Dero Goi (born 1970), musician
Sascha Paeth (born 1970), musician
Heidi Schmidt (1972–2010), novelist, children's author
Jan Schanda (born 1977), footballer
Stefanie Gottschlich (born 1978), footballer
Amanda Somerville (born 1979), musician
Janne Schaefer (born 1981), swimmer, grew up in Wolfsburg
Anna-Katharina Samsel (born 1985), figure skater, model, actress, grew up in Wolfsburg

Gallery

See also

Metropolitan region Hannover-Braunschweig-Göttingen-Wolfsburg

References

External links

City of Wolfsburg
Autostadt
Wolfsburg Art Museum

 
Cities in Lower Saxony
Populated places established in 1938
Wolfsburg, Lower Saxony
1938 establishments in Germany